Guttural speech sounds are those with a primary place of articulation near the back of the oral cavity, especially where it is difficult to distinguish a sound's place of articulation and its phonation. In popular usage it is an imprecise term for sounds produced relatively far back in the vocal tract, such as German ch or the Arabic ayin, but not simple glottal sounds like h. The term 'guttural language' is used for languages that have such sounds.

As a technical term used by phoneticians and phonologists, guttural has had various definitions. The concept always includes pharyngeal consonants, but may include velar, uvular or laryngeal consonants as well.
Guttural sounds are typically consonants, but murmured, pharyngealized, glottalized and strident vowels may be also considered guttural in nature.
Some phonologists argue that all post-velar sounds constitute a natural class.

Meaning and etymology

The term is commonly used non-technically by English speakers to refer to sounds that subjectively appear harsh or grating.

Guttural languages

In popular consciousness, languages that make extensive use of guttural consonants are often considered to be guttural languages. English-speakers sometimes find such languages strange and even hard on the ear.

Examples of significant usage

Languages that extensively use [x], [χ], [ʁ], [ɣ] and/or [q] include:

Afrikaans
Arabic
Armenian
Assamese
Assyrian Neo-Aramaic
Azerbaijani
Crimean Tatar
Dutch
French
German
Greek
Hebrew
Hindustani (Hindi, Urdu)
Irish
Lakota
Manx 
Mongolian language 
Kartvelian languages (i.e. Georgian, Mingrelian, Laz, Svan)
Kurdish
Pashto
Persian 
Scottish Gaelic
Spanish
Tajik Persian
Tswana
Welsh
In addition to their usage of [q], [x], [χ], [ʁ] and [ɣ], these languages also have the pharyngeal consonants of [ʕ] and [ħ]:

Berber languages (i.e. Kabyle, Tamasheq)
Cushitic languages (i.e. Somali and Oromo)
Some Kurdish dialects (as a result of borrowings from Arabic)
Northeast Caucasian languages (i.e. Chechen, Lezgian, Avar) 
Northwest Caucasian (i.e. Abkhaz, Adyghe, Kabardian).
Salishan and Wakashan language families in British Columbia
Semitic languages (i.e. Arabic, Chaldean Neo-Aramaic, Amharic, Tigrinya, Turoyo, Hebrew, Ge’ez)

Examples of partial usage
In French, the only truly guttural sound is (usually) a uvular fricative (or the guttural R). In Portuguese,  is becoming dominant in urban areas.

In Russian,  is assimilated to the palatalization of the following velar consonant: лёгких . It also has a voiced allophone , which occurs before voiced obstruents. In Romanian,  becomes the velar  in word-final positions (duh 'spirit') and before consonants (hrean 'horseradish').

In Kyrgyz, the consonant phoneme  has a uvular realisation in back vowel contexts. In Uyghur, the phoneme  occurs with a back vowel.

The Tuu and Juu (Khoisan) languages of southern Africa have large numbers of guttural vowels. These sounds share certain phonological behaviors that warrant the use of a term specifically for them. There are scattered reports of pharyngeals elsewhere, such as in the Nilo-Saharan, Tama language.

In onsets, it is pronounced as a uvular approximant.

See also
 Guttural R
 Laryngeal consonant

References

Bibliography
Bauer, Michael Blas na Gàidhlig - The Practical Guide to Gaelic Pronunciation (2011), Akerbeltz. 
Beyer, Klaus (1986). The Aramaic language: its distribution and subdivisions. Göttingen: Vandenhoeck und Ruprecht. .
An Introduction to Syriac Studies. Piscataway, NJ: Gorgias Press. .
Kyzlasov I.L. Runic scripts of Eurasian steppes, Восточная литература (Eastern Literature), Moscow, 1994, pp. 80 on, 

Place of articulation
Guttural consonants